Natural Product Reports is a monthly peer-reviewed scientific journal published by the Royal Society of Chemistry. It publishes reviews commissioned by the editorial board on all areas of natural products research. The Executive Editor is Richard Kelly.

Abstracting and indexing 
The journal is abstracted and indexed in CASSI, Science Citation Index, Current Contents/Physical, Chemical & Earth Sciences, Index Medicus/MEDLINE/PubMed, and Scopus.
According to the Journal Citation Reports, the journal has a 2017 impact factor of 11.406.

See also 
Organic & Biomolecular Chemistry
MedChemComm
List of scientific journals
 List of scientific journals in chemistry

References

External links 
 

Chemistry journals
Royal Society of Chemistry academic journals
English-language journals
Publications established in 1984
Monthly journals